The Kyiv Suvorov Military School (KvSVU) (Ukrainian: Київське суворовське військове училище, Russian: Киевское суворовское военное училище) was a boarding school in Kyiv, the capital of the Ukrainian SSR. It was affiliated to Suvorov Military School in the USSR for military cadets. It was succeeded with the Ivan Bohun Military High School following Ukraine's independence in 1991.

History
It was founded on 27 September 1943 as the Kharkiv Suvorov Military School. It was located on the Donets near Kharkiv's Lenin Square. On 1 July 1947, the school was relocated from Kharkiv to Kyiv, where it was renamed the Kyiv Suvorov Officers School. On 20 September 1943, Major General Pyotr Eremin took over the command of the school. According to the Department of Military Educational Institutions of the Red Army, from 18 to 20 November 1943, 415 pupils from the Kharkiv and Voroshilovgrad regions of the Ukrainian SSR, as well as from Voronezh, Kursk, Tula and the Moscow Oblast of the RSFSR. The school was located in the building of the former 2nd Kyiv Red Banner College of self-propelled artillery named after Mikhail Frunze. On 1 August 1955, it was renamed to the Suvorov Military School. In 1992, by the decree of the Cabinet of Ministers of Ukraine on 19 August 1992, the Ivan Bohun Military High School was established on the basis of the Kyiv Suvorov Military School.

Over the years, 44 graduations of cadets have been conducted. In 1953, cadets of the school marched in the October Revolution Parade on Moscow's Red Square. Prior to that, it had also taken part in the International Workers' Day parade on the square since 1951. On 24 January 2019, the monument to Alexander Suvorov, erected in front of the building of the former school in 1974, was demolished.

Heads of the school
 1943-1944 - Peter Eremin
 1944-1945 - Viktor Vizzhilin
 1945-1954 - Andrei Tomashevsky
 1954-1956 - Ivan Kisses
 1956-1958 - Terenty Umansky
 1958-1970 - Boris Kibardin
 1970-1985 - Ivan Kaurkin
 1985-1992 - Viktor Sidorov

Notable alumni
Ruslan Bogdan – Ukrainian businessman and politician
Viktor Bondar – Former Minister of Transport and Communication of Ukraine
Anatoliy Hrytsenko – Minister of Defence of Ukraine
Mikhail Davydov – Russian doctor and oncologist
Anatoly Kostenko – Former Minister of Defence of Belarus

See also
 Minsk Suvorov Military School
 Tiraspol Suvorov Military School

References

Suvorov Military School
Military history of Ukraine
Educational institutions established in 1943
Educational institutions disestablished in 1992
Military education and training in the Soviet Union